The Pimlico Special is a Grade 3 American thoroughbred horse race for horses age three and older over a distance of  miles ( furlongs) held at Pimlico Race Course in Baltimore, Maryland in mid May.  The race currently offers a purse of $300,000.

History

The Pimlico Special was first run in 1937 and was won by that year's U.S. Triple Crown winner War Admiral who went on to be voted the American Horse of the Year. In 1938, the Pimlico Special was host to one of American racing's most historic moments when Seabiscuit defeated War Admiral in a much anticipated match race. That race was covered by almost every major newspaper, magazine and radio station of the time.

Discontinued after 1958, the race was revived as a handicap event in 1988 and made a graded stakes race one year later in 1989. The race was not eligible for grading in 2011 because it had not been run the previous two years.

Eighteen Pimlico Special winners have gone on to win a Championship for Horse of the Year or an Eclipse Award as the best horse in their divisions. The latest was Invasor in 2006; others include Mineshaft, Real Quiet, Skip Away, Cigar, Criminal Type, Blushing John, Tom Fool, Capot, Citation, Assault, Armed, Twilight Tear, Whirlaway, Market Wise, Challedon, Seabiscuit and War Admiral.

The Pimlico track record for  miles is held by Farma Way who ran the distance in 1:52 2/5 while capturing the 1991 Pimlico Special.

Records 

Speed  record:
 1:52.40 – Farma Way (1991) (at current distance of   miles)

Most wins by a horse:
 2 – Challedon (1939 & 1940)

Most wins by a jockey:
 4 – Eddie Arcaro (1939, 1943, 1946, 1948)

Most wins by a trainer:
 4 – Ben A. Jones (1942, 1944, 1945, 1947)
 4 – John M. Gaver Sr. (1943, 1949, 1950, 1953)

Most wins by an owner:
 6 – Calumet Farm (1942, 1944, 1945, 1947, 1948, 1990)

Winners of the "Pimlico Special" since 1937 

Notes:
 ‡ For 3-yr-olds in 1937 and 1954
 † Won by Walkovers in 1942 and 1948

See also 
 Pimlico Special "top three finishers" and starters
 Preakness Stakes
 Black-Eyed Susan Stakes
 Pimlico Race Course
 List of graded stakes at Pimlico Race Course

References 

 Official website for the Pimlico Special 
 The Pimlico Special at Pedigree Query
 War Admiral Wins the First Pimlico Special, 1937

Graded stakes races in the United States
Open middle distance horse races
Recurring events established in 1937
Pimlico Race Course
Horse races in Maryland
Sports competitions in Baltimore
Recurring sporting events established in 1937
1937 establishments in Maryland